The 150th Army Division(3rd Formation) was formed in November 1967 from 1st, 5th, 10th and 12th Independent Regiments, Independent Infantry Battalion and Independent Antiaircraft Battalion of Chengdu Military Region.

The division maintained as a Catalogue B unit from 1967 to its disbandment.

In February the division took part in the Sino-Vietnamese War. Before the beginning of the war, he division expanded from 6000 personnel (peacetime Cat B division) to 11000. At the blink of war the division was composed of:
448th Infantry Regiment;
449th Infantry Regiment;
450th Infantry Regiment;
Artillery Regiment.

The division took part in the Battle of Cao Bang.

On March 11, 1979, when retreating from Ban young region to China, the division's 448th Infantry Regiment, commanded by Li Shaowen(), run into an ambush set by 851st Regiment, PAVN 346th Division. The regimental HQ soon lost contact with all its units, and the whole regiment was in panic.

By March 13, 1979 the 2nd Battalion of 448th Regiment was surrounded and overrun. To make things worse, 1st Company, 1st Battalion and 8th Company, 3rd Battalion, sent by the regimental HQ to relieve them, were also surrounded. By March 14 all surrounded PLA units were either surrendered or destroyed. The last survivor from 2nd battalion finally reached the border of China on March 31.

During the engagement 7 PLA companies & batteries (1st, 4th, 5th, 6th, 8th Rifle Companies, Machine-gun Company and Mortar-Artillery Battery of the 2nd Battalion) were annihilated. 448th Regiment suffered 542 "missing", soon after it was cleared that 209 of which were captured or surrendered, the other of which KIA. The engagement is considered by China as the biggest failure during the war.

The division was disbanded in September 1985 along with the Army Corps.

The division's codename was Military Unit 56018.

References

中国人民解放军各步兵师沿革, http://blog.sina.com.cn/s/blog_a3f74a990101cp1q.html

Infantry divisions of the People's Liberation Army
Sino-Vietnamese War
Military units and formations established in 1967
Military units and formations disestablished in 1985